Count István II. Koháry (Csábrág, 1649–1731), the poet, politician and general was a member of the Hungarian House of Koháry.

Life
István Koháry was the eldest son of István Koháry (1616–1664) and the Hungarian noble woman Judith of Balsassa. His father died when he was 15. After studying at the Jesuit university of Trnava he became the hereditary commander of Fülek castle. During the uprise of Imre Thököly he was sieged there in the year 1682 for several weeks and finally taken hostage by Thököly. Koháry refused to side with him and stayed loyal to the Habsburg king Leopold. For the next three years he remained imprisoned by the Kuruc. After the Battle of Vienna 1683 the Turks and with them also Thököly were driven out of Hungary and 1685 István became free. He was received with all honours at the Imperial court of Vienna. Emperor Leopold called him Speculum Fidelitatis, the mirror of loyalty  and awarded him the title Count and the hereditary headship of Hont County. 1714 he became Judge royal, the second-highest judge, preceded only by the palatine, in the Kingdom of Hungary.

Work
During his captivity István began to write poems, unusual for his time not in Latin, but in Hungarian language.

Death and legacy
István Koháry remained unmarried and died highly honoured at the age of 82 at Csábrág castle.  In his testament he founded a Fideicommis and stated that every head of it have to be a catholic. His nephew  Andreas Josef Koháry (1694–1757) became his heir.
István Koháry was buried in the family crypt at the abbey of Hronský Beňadik. 1909 Tsar Ferdinand of Bulgaria commissioned a marble monument for the church to honour his famous ancestor.

Ancestry

See also
Ferenc József Koháry

References

External links 
 http://mek.niif.hu/00300/00355/html/index.html
 

Istvan Kohary
1649 births
1731 deaths
17th-century Austrian people
18th-century Austrian people
18th-century Hungarian poets
Hungarian male poets
Austrian nobility
Judges royal
17th-century Hungarian poets